Thandolwenkosi Dlodlo (born 22 April 1999) is a South African sprinter.

He ran in 10.08 in Trieste in July 2019 and won a bronze medal in the 4×100 metres relay at the African Games in Rabat the following month.

In March 2022, Dlodlo was banned retrospectively for two-and-a-half years after testing positive for "testosterone and its related compounds". South Africa was stripped of its 4x100m gold medal, won in Chorzów, Poland when Dlodlo was part of the team.

International competitions

References

External links
IAAF Athlete’s profile

Living people
1999 births
South African male sprinters
Athletes (track and field) at the 2019 African Games
African Games bronze medalists for South Africa
African Games medalists in athletics (track and field)
Place of birth missing (living people)